Pasquale is a masculine Italian given name and a surname mainly found in southern Italy.  It is a cognate of the French name Pascal, the Spanish Pascual, the Portuguese Pascoal and the Catalan Pasqual. Pasquale derives from the Latin paschalis or pashalis,  which means "relating to Easter", from Latin pascha ("Easter"), Greek Πάσχα, Aramaic pasḥā, in turn from the Hebrew פֶּסַח, which means "to be born on, or to be associated with, Passover day". Since the Hebrew holiday Passover coincides closely with the later Christian holiday of Easter, the Latin word came to be used for both occasions.

The names Paschal, Pasqual, Pascal, Pascale, Pascha, Paschalis, Pascual, Pascoe and Pasco are all variations of Pasquale. The feminine form, rather rare, is Pasquala, Pasqualina, Pascale, Pascalle or Pascalina. As a surname in Italy, Pasquale has many variations found all over the country: Pasquali, Pascale, Pascal, Pascali, Pascalis, De Pascalis, Pasqual, De Pasqual, De Pascal, De Pasquali, Di Pasquale, DiPasquale, Di Pascali, Di Pasquali, De Pasquale, De Pasqualin, De Pasqualis, Pasqualin, Pasqualini, Pasqualino, Pasqualon, Pasqualotto, Pasqualigo, Pasqualetti.

Pasquale may refer to:

Given name
 Pasquale Amati (1716–1796), an Italian antiquary
 Pasquale Amato (1878–1942), Italian operatic baritone
 Pasquale Anfossi (1727–1797), Italian opera composer
 Pasquale Berardi (born 1983), an Italian footballer
 Pasquale Bini ( 1716–1770), Italian violinist
 Pasquale Borgomeo (1933–2009), an Italian Catholic Jesuit priest
 Pasquale Buonocore (1916–2003), an Italian water polo player
 Pasquale Festa Campanile (1927–1986), Italian screenwriter and film director
 Pasquale Camerlengo (born 1966), an Italian retired competitive ice dancer
 Pasquale Cajano (1921–2000), an Italian-American film actor
 Pasquale Carpino (1936–2005), Italian Chef, host of Pasquale's Kitchen Express
 Pasquale Cicogna (1509–1595), Italian politician, the Doge of Venice from 1585 to 1595
 Pasquale "Pat" Cipollone (born 1966), American lawyer, White House Counsel for President Trump
 Pasquale Joseph Federico (1902–1982), an American patent attorney and mathematician
 Pasquale Foggia (born 1983), Italian footballer
 Pasquale Fornara (1925–1990), an Italian road bicycle racer
 Pasquale Galluppi (1770–1846), Italian philosopher
 Pasquale Gravina (born 1970), Italian professional volleyball player
 Pasquale Gumbo, fictional character in Rose Is Rose comic strip
 Pasquale Macchi (1923–2006), an Italian Catholic archbishop, private secretary to Pope Paul VI.
 Pasquale Stanislao Mancini (1817–1888), an Italian jurist and statesman.
 Pasquale Marino (born 1962), Italian football coach
 Pasquale Mastroianni, (born 1971) Canadian actor
 Pasquale Ottini (c. 1570 - 1630), an Italian painter of the early-Baroque period, active mainly in Verona
 Pasquale Padalino (born 1972), an Italian footballer
 Pasquale Paoli (1725–1807), a Corsican patriot and leader
 Pasquale del Pezzo (1859–1936), an Italian mathematician
 Pasquale Rizzoli (1871–1953), an Italian sculptor
 Pasquale Rossi (1641 - after 1718), Italian painter
 Pasquale Simonelli (1878–1960), an Italian-American banker.
 Pasquale Villari (1827–1917), an Italian historian and politician.
 Pasquale of Bourbon, Prince of Two Sicilies, Count of Bari (1852–1904), an Italian noble

Surname
 Anton de Pasquale (born 1995), Australian motor racing driver
 Arnaud Di Pasquale (born 1979), French tennis player
 Eli Pasquale (born 1960), former star Canadian basketball player
 Emanuel di Pasquale, American poet and translator
 Frédéric de Pasquale (1931–2001), French actor
 Giovanni Pasquale (born 1982), Italian football player
 James Di Pasquale (born 1941), American composer
 Joe Pasquale (born 1961), British comedian
 Joseph de Pasquale, American violist
 Lisa De Pasquale, Political columnist
 Luigi Di Pasquale, Italian footballer
 Mauro Di Pasquale, American columnist
 Pancrazio De Pasquale (1925–1992), Italian politician
 Simone Di Pasquale (born 1978), Italian professional dancer and TV personality
 Steven Pasquale, American actor
 Umberto Pasquale (1906–1985), Italian priest and writer

Other
 Pasquale Hnos., a Peruvian fast food franchise
 Don Pasquale, a comic opera by Gaetano Donizetti
 Olivo e Pasquale, a melodramma giocoso by Gaetano Donizetti
 Pasquale, pseudonym of Don Manley (born 1945), British crossword compiler
 Pasquale (film), 1916 American silent film

See also
 Pasqual (disambiguation)
 Pascual (disambiguation)
 Pascal (disambiguation)
 Paschal (disambiguation)

Italian masculine given names
Italian-language surnames

lb:Pascal (Virnumm)
pl:Paschalis